Jimmy Boy is a 1935 British comedy film directed by John Baxter and starring Jimmy O'Dea, Guy Middleton and Enid Stamp-Taylor. It was made at Cricklewood Studios.

Cast

References

Bibliography
Wood, Linda. British Films, 1927–1939. British Film Institute, 1986.

External links

1935 films
1935 comedy films
1930s English-language films
British comedy films
Films shot at Cricklewood Studios
Films directed by John Baxter
British black-and-white films
1930s British films